Kay Smith may refer to:

Kay Nolte Smith (1932–1993), American writer
Kay Smith (artist), artist from Illinois
Clara Kathleen Smith (1911–2004), Canadian poet from New Brunswick
Kay Zinck ( Smith; 1961–2022), Canadian curler